"Some Girls" is a pop song by the British pop group Racey; it was their third single release. The song was written by Nicky Chinn and Mike Chapman, produced by Mickie Most, and released in 1979 on the RAK Records label.

The song was a big hit for Racey in Britain and Ireland, reaching number two in both countries; in Australia, New Zealand and South Africa it reached number one.

The song was covered by Barry Manilow on his 1982 album Here Comes the Night. Irish country musician Mike Denver has also performed this song live at many of his concerts.

Although "Some Girls" never broke into the charts in the United States, it is with some irony that the song was used in season 11, episode 21 of Happy Days, titled "Good News, Bad News", in which Charles "Chachi" Arcano (Scott Baio) receives news that his song has entered the charts. The bad news hinted at in the episode's title refers to Chachi being diagnosed with Type 1 diabetes and viewing it as a death sentence. In the episode the opening bars of "Some Girls" are heard on the radio in the Cunningham's lounge room at the start of the episode and again at the end of the episode on the jukebox at Al's Diner.

Charts

Weekly charts

Year-end charts

Certifications

References

1979 songs
Racey songs
Barry Manilow songs
Songs written by Mike Chapman
Songs written by Nicky Chinn
Song recordings produced by Mickie Most
Number-one singles in Australia
Number-one singles in New Zealand
Number-one singles in South Africa